NMB48 (read "N.M.B. Forty-eight") is a Japanese idol group that debuted in 2011 as the second sister group to AKB48, produced by Yasushi Akimoto. NMB48 is named after the Namba district in Osaka city of Osaka Prefecture, where the group is based. The group performs at the NMB48 Theater, which is located in the basement of the Yes-Namba Building in Namba, Osaka. The group has sold over 9 million CDs in Japan.

History 

2010
On July 10, 2010, AKB48 first announced that they would be forming a second sister national group, based in Namba. NMB48 officially became active on October 9, 2010. Yasushi Akimoto announced that the group would have 26 trainees for the first generation. These members made their first appearance at the AKB48 Tokyo Autumn Festival.

2011
NMB48 made their debut performance at their theater on New Year's Day 2011. They released their debut single, "Zetsumetsu Kurokami Shōjo", on July 20, 2011. In its debut week, the single sold a total of about 218,000 copies, making it the bestselling single on the Oricon weekly charts for the week of July 20–27, 2011. This makes NMB48 the second girl group after Passpo to reach number 1 with a debut single.

2012
On August 24, 2012, the first day of AKB48's Tokyo Dome Concert, it was revealed that Team A member Yui Yokoyama would also hold a position in NMB48. Miyuki Watanabe of Team N would hold a concurrent position in AKB48 Team B.  Also, Riho Kotani of Team N will hold a concurrent position in AKB48, Team A.

On September 3, Eriko Jo, a member of Team M, announced that she would be leaving the group during the performance at the theater. Her "graduation" performance was on September 28 at the NMB48 Theater. Following Jo's graduation, two members from Team M announced their resignation in early October. On October 9, three trainees were promoted to Team M to replace the members who had left. Fuuko Yagura became the new "center" member of Team M.

On October 10, sixteen third-generation trainees formed Team BII. On December 19, Yui Yokoyama was promoted to Team N.

2013
On April 18, 2013, first-generation member Nana Yamada was transferred from Team N to Team M, and trainee members Naruma Koga and Aika Nishimura were promoted to Team N. At the AKB48 Group Concert in the Nippon Budokan on April 28, 2013, it was announced that Yui Yokoyama's concurrent position in the group would end, and that AKB48 Member Miori Ichikawa would have a concurrent position in Team N.

2014
In the AKB48 Group Daisokaku Matsuri held on February 24, 2014, major changes occurred to NMB48. Sayaka Yamamoto became a concurrent member of Team K. Miyuki Watanabe became a concurrent member of Team S, and was transferred from Team N to Team BII. Mayu Ogasawara was transferred completely to Team B, Nana Yamada became a concurrent member of Team KII.

On October 15, 2014, Nana Yamada announced her graduation on the group's 4th anniversary live and will graduate on April 3, 2015.

2015
On March 31, 2015, the group released their 11th single Don't look back!. This was Nana Yamada's first solo center, as well as her last time in a NMB48 single and senbatsu.

On July 15, 2015, the group released their 12th single Dorian Shōnen. This was Ririka Sutou's first center in senbatsu.

On October 7, 2015, the group released their 13th single Must be now.

2016

On April 13, 2016, Miyuki Watanabe announced her graduation from the group. On the same day Sayaka Yamamoto announced her resignation from AKB48's Team K.

On April 27, 2016, the group released their 14th single Amagami Hime.

On August 3, 2016, they released their 15th single Boku wa Inai. This was Miyuki Watanabe's last center in senbatsu as well as her last single with NMB48. The music video for the A-side was shot in Thailand.

On December 28, 2016, the group released their 16th single Boku Igai no Dareka.

2017
On December 27, 2017, the group released their 17th single Warota People. This was the first and only single to be released in that year.

2018

On April 4, 2018, the group released their 18th single Yokubomono.

On June 15, 2018, 6 members of NMB48 (Cocona Umeyama, Kokoro Naiki, Yuuka Kato, Miru Shiroma, Azusa Uemura and Sae Murase) joined Produce 48. Both Cocona Umeyama and Azusa Uemura withdrew from the show.  Kokoro Naiki, Yuuka Kato, Sae Murase and Miru Shiroma ranked 87, 74, 22 and 20 respectively. None of them made it to the final line-up of Iz*One.

On July 30, 2018, Sayaka Yamamoto, captain of Team N announced in NMB48 LIVE TOUR 2018 in Summer that she would be graduating from NMB48.

On September 25, 2018, the group released the music video for their 19th single Boku Datte naichau yo, which was released on October 17, 2018. .

2019
On February 20, 2019, the group released their 20th single Tokonoma Seiza Musume. Miru Shiroma is the center for this single. On August 14, 2019, the group released their 21st single Bokou e Kaere! which was their first single to release in the Reiwa period. On September 4, 2019, Yuuri Ota announced her graduation. On November 6, 2019, the group released their 22st single Hatsukoi Shijo Shugi.

2020
On August 19, 2020, the group released their 23rd single Datte Datte Datte. The single originally scheduled to release on May 13, 2020, but was withdrawn at the height of COVID-19 pandemic.

2021
On January 1, 2021, a new project NAMBATTLE was announced as part of an effort to revitalize the group's image, which included the disbandment of Team N, Team M and Team BII. All members were assigned to one of 6 groups, decided by lottery drawings. The winner of the project would earn the opportunity to get a new song and music video as part of NMB48's next release, as well as a new theatre stage and adjusted media appearances.

2022
On January 1, 2022, the reformation of Team N, Team M and Team BII was announced to take effect from February. As the new Team BII is composed entirely of kenkyuusei members, they will start to be officially referred to as Team BII Kenkyuusei.

On the same date, the project NAMBATTLE 2 was also announced, which, alongside other programmes, also include a general election for NMB48 members that will be held on March 27, 2022. The winner of the event was Chihiro Kawakami with 21,462 votes, and she will subsequently be the center for NMB48's 27th single.

Members

Team N 
Team N is associated with the color Ochre Orange. The current captain is Haruka Sadano and the current vice-captain is Mai Hirayama.

Team M 
Team M is associated with the color Fuchsia Purple. The current captain is Karen Hara and the current co-captain is Wakana Abe.

Team BII Kenkyuusei 
Team BII, officially referred to as Team BII Kenkyuusei as of January 1, 2022, is associated with the color Navy Blue. The current captain is Aika Satsuki and the current co-captain is Wakana Sumino. All of its current members are kenkyuusei.

Graduated Members

Team N

Team M

Team BII

NMB48 Promoted Members

Discography

Studio albums

Stage albums

Singles

See also 
 Yoshimoto Kogyo

References

External links 

  

 
AKB48 Group
Japanese girl groups
Japanese idol groups
Japanese pop music groups
Musical groups established in 2010
Musical groups from Osaka
2010 establishments in Japan